Verle may refer to:
Verle, Maharashtra, village in India

People with the surname
João Verle (1929–2015), Brazilian economist and politician
Giovan Battista Verle, 17th-century Italian instrument maker